Head of the River may refer to more than one type of rowing competition:

 Bumps race
 Eights Week, Oxford University (May)
 Lent Bumps, Cambridge University (February–March)
 May Bumps, Cambridge University (June)
 Torpids, Oxford University (March)
 Head race
 Head of the River Amstel (the Netherlands)
 Head of the River (Australia)
 Head of the River (New South Wales)
 Head of the River (Victoria)
 Head of the River (Western Australia)
 Head of the River Race, London
 Women's Eights Head of the River Race, London

See also
 Riverhead (disambiguation)